Dame Mary Lucy Cartwright,  (17 December 1900 – 3 April 1998) was a British mathematician. She was one of the pioneers of what would later become known as chaos theory. Along with J. E. Littlewood, Cartwright saw many solutions to a problem which would later be seen as an example of the butterfly effect.

Early life and education

Mary Cartwright was born on 17 December 1900, in Aynho, Northamptonshire, where her father William Digby was vicar. Through her grandmother Jane Holbech, she descended from poet John Donne and William Mompesson, Vicar of Eyam. She had four siblings, two older and two younger: John (born 1896), Nigel (born 1898), Jane (born 1905), and William (born 1907). Her early education was at Leamington High School (1912–1915), and then at Gravely Manor School in Boscombe (1915–1916) before completion in Godolphin School in Salisbury (1916–1919).

Cartwright studied mathematics at St Hugh's College, Oxford, graduating in 1923 with a first class degree. She was the first woman to attain the final degree lectures and to obtain a first. She briefly taught at Alice Ottley School in Worcester and Wycombe Abbey School in Buckinghamshire before returning to Oxford in 1928 to read for her D.Phil. Cartwright was supervised by G. H. Hardy in her doctoral studies. During the academic year 1928–9 Hardy was at Princeton, so it was E. C. Titchmarsh who took over the duties as a supervisor. Her thesis "The Zeros of Integral Functions of Special Types" was examined by J. E. Littlewood, whom she met for the first time as an external examiner in her oral examination for that 1930 D.Phil.

In 1930, Cartwright was awarded a Yarrow Research Fellowship and went to Girton College, Cambridge to continue working on the topic of her doctoral thesis. Attending Littlewood's lectures, she solved one of the open problems which he posed. Her mathematical theorem, now known as Cartwright's Theorem, gives an estimate for the maximum modulus of an analytic function that takes the same value no more than p times in the unit disc. To prove the theorem she used a new approach, applying a technique introduced by Lars Ahlfors for conformal mappings.

Career 
Throughout her career, Cartwright wrote over ninety articles on several different mathematical concepts. Her contributions extended to topics such as the Dirichlet series, Abel summation, directions of Borel spreads, analytic functions regular on the unit disk, the zeros of integral functions, maximum and minimum moduli, and functions of finite order in an angle.  
In 1936, Cartwright became director of studies in mathematics at Girton College. In 1938, she began work on a new project which had a major impact on the direction of her research. The Radio Research Board of the Department of Scientific and Industrial Research produced a memorandum regarding certain differential equations which came out of modelling radio and radar work. They asked the London Mathematical Society if they could help find a mathematician who could work on these problems and she became interested. The dynamics lying behind the problems were unfamiliar to Cartwright, so she approached Littlewood for help with this aspect. They began to collaborate studying the equations, which greatly surprised the two:
The fine structure described here is today seen to be a typical instance of the butterfly effect. The collaboration led to important results which have greatly influenced the direction that the modern theory of dynamical systems has taken. Although the duo did not supply the answer in time, they succeeded in directing the engineers' attention away from faulty equipment towards practical ways of compensating for the electrical "noise" - or erratic fluctuations - being produced.

She set her version of the proof as a Tripos question, later published in an appendix to Sir Harold Jeffreys' book Scientific Inference. In 1947, she was elected to be a Fellow of the Royal Society; although she was not the first woman to be elected to that Society, she was the first female mathematician.

Cartwright was appointed Mistress of Girton in 1948 and a Reader in the Theory of Functions in Cambridge in 1959 until 1968. From 1957 to 1960, she was president of the Cambridge Association of University Women. After retiring from Girton, she was a visiting professor at Brown University from 1968 to 1969 and at Claremont Graduate School from 1969 to 1970. Cartwright died in Cambridge, on 3 April 1998 at the age of 97.

Recognition
Cartwright was the first woman:
to serve on the Council of the Royal Society
to be President of the Mathematical Association (in 1951)
to be President of the London Mathematical Society (in 1961–62)
to receive the Sylvester Medal (in 1964)
 to receive the De Morgan Medal, the highest award of the London Mathematical Society (in 1968)

In 1968, Cartwright became the first woman to receive the De Morgan Medal, the highest award of the London Mathematical Society, and was elected an Honorary Fellow of The Royal Society of Edinburgh (HonFRSE). In 1969, she received the distinction of being honoured by the Queen, becoming Dame Mary Cartwright, Dame Commander of the Order of the British Empire.

Death
Cartwright died in Midfield Lodge Nursing Home in Cambridge in 1998.

Publications
 
 1956: Integral Functions, Cambridge Tracts in Mathematics and Mathematical Physics No. 44

References

External links
 
 
 Dame Mary Lucy Cartwright at Biographies of Women Mathematicians, Agnes Scott College

1900 births
1998 deaths
Alumni of St Hugh's College, Oxford
20th-century British mathematicians
Dames Commander of the Order of the British Empire
Female Fellows of the Royal Society
Fellows of Girton College, Cambridge
Mistresses of Girton College, Cambridge
People from Aynho
British women mathematicians
People educated at Godolphin School
Fellows of the Royal Society
20th-century British women scientists
20th-century women mathematicians